Pawnee County (standard abbreviation: PN) is a county located in the U.S. state of Kansas. As of the 2020 census, the county population was 6,253. The largest city and county seat is Larned.

The county is named after the Pawnee Tribe.

Geography

Adjacent counties
 Rush County (north)
 Barton County (northeast)
 Stafford County (east)
 Edwards County (south)
 Hodgeman County (west)
 Ness County (northwest)

National protected area
 Fort Larned National Historic Site

Demographics

As of the census of 2000, there were 7,233 people, 2,739 households, and 1,785 families residing in the county.  The population density was 10 people per square mile (4/km2).  There were 3,114 housing units at an average density of 4 per square mile (2/km2).  The racial makeup of the county was 90.96% White, 5.00% Black or African American, 0.95% Native American, 0.57% Asian, 1.22% from other races, and 1.30% from two or more races.  4.16% of the population were Hispanic or Latino of any race.

There were 2,739 households, out of which 29.20% had children under the age of 18 living with them, 54.80% were married couples living together, 7.30% had a female householder with no husband present, and 34.80% were non-families. 32.20% of all households were made up of individuals, and 15.60% had someone living alone who was 65 years of age or older.  The average household size was 2.31 and the average family size was 2.91.

In the county, the population was spread out, with 24.20% under the age of 18, 7.30% from 18 to 24, 25.40% from 25 to 44, 24.60% from 45 to 64, and 18.50% who were 65 years of age or older.  The median age was 40 years. For every 100 females there were 112.00 males.  For every 100 females age 18 and over, there were 112.70 males.

The median income for a household in the county was $35,175, and the median income for a family was $45,634. Males had a median income of $26,751 versus $20,931 for females. The per capita income for the county was $17,584.  About 5.40% of families and 11.80% of the population were below the poverty line, including 9.00% of those under age 18 and 9.90% of those age 65 or over.

Government

Presidential elections
Pawnee County has been primarily Republican for the majority of its history. However, there have been multiple stretches where it was considered a swing county, backing the national winner in all presidential elections from 1904 to 1936 as well as 1964 to 1988. It has trended away from bellwether status since 1988 however.

Laws
Following amendment to the Kansas Constitution in 1986, Pawnee County remained a prohibition, or "dry", county until 1992, when voters approved the sale of alcoholic liquor by the individual drink with a 30 percent food sales requirement.

Education

Unified school districts
 Ft. Larned USD 495
 Pawnee Heights USD 496

Communities

Cities
 Burdett
 Garfield
 Larned
 Rozel

Unincorporated communities
 Ash Valley
 Frizell
 Sanford
 Zook

Townships
Pawnee County is divided into twenty-one townships.  The city of Larned is considered governmentally independent and is excluded from the census figures for the townships.  In the following table, the population center is the largest city (or cities) included in that township's population total, if it is of a significant size.

See also

References

Further reading

County
 Along the Old Trail; Tucker Vernon Co; 190 pages; 1910.  History of Pawnee County (page 113 to 134).  Larned and Pawnee County at Present (page 135 to 190).
 Atlas and Plat Book of Pawnee County, Kansas; Kenyon Co; 37 pages; 1916.
 Plat Book of Pawnee County, Kansas; North West Publishing Co; 36 pages; 1902.
Trails
 The Story of the Marking of the Santa Fe Trail by the Daughters of the American Revolution in Kansas and the State of Kansas; Almira Cordry; Crane Co; 164 pages; 1915. (Download 4MB PDF eBook)
 The National Old Trails Road To Southern California, Part 1 (LA to KC)''; Automobile Club Of Southern California; 64 pages; 1916. (Download 6.8MB PDF eBook)

External links

County
 
 Pawnee County - Directory of Public Officials
Maps
 Pawnee County Maps: Current, Historic, KDOT
 Kansas Highway Maps: Current, Historic, KDOT
 Kansas Railroad Maps: Current, 1996, 1915, KDOT and Kansas Historical Society

 
Kansas counties
Kansas placenames of Native American origin
1867 establishments in Kansas
Populated places established in 1867